Angela Michelle Little (born July 22, 1972) is an American model and actress. She is Playboys Playmate of the Month for August 1998, and she has appeared in several Playboy videos and special editions, working steadily for Playboy for more than five years following her centerfold appearance.

Early life 
Little was born in Albertville, Alabama.

Career 
Playboy magazine founder and publisher Hugh Hefner's nickname for Little was "Little Marilyn". Little has had roles in a number of mainstream films including Walk Hard starring John C. Reilly, American Pie: Band Camp, Rush Hour 2 and My Boss's Daughter. She has been a guest star in episodes of TV series such as Cold Case, CSI, Nip/Tuck, Monk, The Mullets, Charmed, Malcolm in the Middle, Reno 911! and the soap opera The Bold and the Beautiful, plus a role on the short-lived TV series Buddy Faro. She also hosted the E! Channel's Wild on the Windy City.

Personal life 
Little married actor and musician Andy Mackenzie on August 20, 2005, but later divorced him.

Filmography

Film

Television

Video games

References

External links
 
 

1972 births
Living people
People from Albertville, Alabama
American film actresses
1990s Playboy Playmates
American television actresses
Actresses from Alabama
21st-century American women